Hones is a surname. Notable people with the surname include:

 J.J. Hones (born 1987), American basketball player
 Josef Hones (born 1954), Austrian ski mountaineer and biathlete

Hones can also refer to:
 , a cultivar of Karuka

See also
 Hone